Maurice Holleaux (15 April 1861 – 21 September 1932) was a 19th–20th-century French historian, archaeologist and epigrapher, a specialist of Ancient Greece.

Biography

Années de formation 
Admitted in the École normale supérieure in 1879, Holleaux was agrégé in history in 1881 and became a member of the French School at Athens in 1882. He then conducted epigraphic explorations in Samos and Rhodes. He devoted thereafter an important scientific activity in the latter city. In 1884 he undertook missions in Asia Minor during which he discovered with Pierre Paris the inscription of Diogenes of Oenoanda. Back in Greece, he excavated in Boeotia the Ptoion sanctuary which had been previously identified by the traveler William Leake. Between 1884 and 1891 he directed the excavation of this shrine to Apollo Ptoios in Boeotia. In 1888 he discovered an inscription bearing the text of the speech Nero spoke in Corinth in 67 to restitute their freedom to the Greeks.

Career 
He was appointed in the University of Lyon in 1888. He then became a friend of Philippe Fabia. His research abandoned the archaeological area to focus more exclusively on epigraphy.

Leaving Lyon after sixteen years of teaching, he directed the French School at Athens from 1904 to 1912. Succeeding Théophile Homolle, he led archaeological activities of the school and then oversaw the archaeological exploration of Delos.

On his return to France, he was a lecturer at the Faculty of Paris. In 1918 he published a memoir which then became his complementary thesis:Étude sur la traduction en grec du titre consulaire. In 1923, he defended his main thesis, completed at the end of 1920: Rome, la Grèce et les monarchies hellénistiques au IIIe s. BC, 273-205 during a session remained memorable where he himself was critical of his own work. The work yet deeply renewed the perspective on the attitude of Rome to the Greeks. Holleaux was then appointed professor of Hellenistic antiquity to a Chair at the Sorbonne.

In 1928 he became a member of the Académie des inscriptions et belles-lettres. In 1927, he succeeded Paul Foucart to the chair of Greek epigraphy of the College de France.

Maurice Holleaux was the master of historian Louis Robert who gathered and published posthumously his articles. One of his sons was the magistrate and lawyer Georges Holleaux (1893-1973).

References

Works

Books 
 Strategos hupatos : Étude sur la traduction en grec du titre consulaire, Paris, 1918.
 Rome, la Grèce et les monarchies hellénistiques au IIIe siècle avant J. C. (273-205), de Boccard, Paris, 1921.
 Études d'épigraphie et d'histoire grecque, t. I-II, textes rassemblés par Louis Robert, Paris, 1938.
 Études d'épigraphie et d'histoire grecque, t. III, textes rassemblés par Louis Robert, Paris, 1942.
 Études d'épigraphie et d'histoire grecque, t. IV, textes rassemblés par Louis Robert, Paris, 1952.
 Études d'épigraphie et d'histoire grecque, t. V, textes rassemblés par Louis Robert, Paris, 1957.

Articles (selection) 
 « The Romans in Illyria », Cambridge ancient History, VII, 1928.
 « Rome and Macedon », Cambridge ancient History, VIII, 1930.
 « The Romans against Philip », Cambridge ancient History, VIII, 1930.
 « Rome and Antiochos », Cambridge ancient History, VIII, 1930.

Bibliography 
 Étienne Michon, "Éloge funèbre de M. Maurice Holleaux, membre de l'Académie", Comptes rendus de l'Académie des inscriptions et belles-lettres, 76-3, 1932, (p. 329–337) Read online
 Mario Roques, « Notice sur la vie et les travaux de M. Maurice Holleaux », membre de l'Académie, CRAI, 87-1, 1943, (p. 14–73) Read online
 Werner Hartkopf: Die Akademie der Wissenschaften der DDR. Ein Beitrag zu ihrer Geschichte. Biografischer Index, Akademie, Berlin 1983, (p. 200)
 Christa Kirsten (Hrsg.): Die Altertumswissenschaften an der Berliner Akademie. Wahlvorschläge zur Aufnahme von Mitgliedern von F.A. Wolf bis zu G. Rodenwaldt. Akademie-Verlag, Berlin 1985 (Studien zur Geschichte der Akademie der Wissenschaften der DDR, Band 5), (p. 140–141).

External links 
 Maurice Holleaux on data.bnf.fr
 Maurice Holleaux on Persée
  Maurice Holleaux, Études d'épigraphie et d'histoire grecques. Tome IV : Rome, la Macédoine et l'Orient grec. Première partie, 1952 (compte rendu) 

20th-century French historians
French hellenists
French epigraphers
French archaeologists
Classical archaeologists
Members of the Prussian Academy of Sciences
Academic staff of the University of Lyon
Academic staff of the University of Paris
Members of the Académie des Inscriptions et Belles-Lettres
Academic staff of the Collège de France
École Normale Supérieure alumni
Members of the French School at Athens
1861 births
People from Château-Thierry
1932 deaths